Anlu is a county-level city in east-central Hubei province, China. It is under the administration of the prefecture-level city of Xiaogan. The siege of De'an took place here during the Song-Jin Wars.

Administrative divisions

Two subdistricts:
Fucheng Subdistrict, Nancheng Subdistrict.

Nine towns:
Zhaopeng, Lidian, Xundian, Tangdi, Leigong, Wangyizhen, Yandian, Bofan, Fushui

Four townships:
Chendian Township, Xinzha Township, Muzi Township, Jieguan Township

One other area:
Anlu Economic Development Area

History 
Chinese people republic

September 1987: Anlu became a town according to the documents from central government.

Location 
Anlu is at the northeastern part of Hubei province, near Mount Tongbo and Mount Dahong. Route 316, Route 107, Hanshi expressway, and Handan railway goes through the city. Anlu is 80 km from Wuhan.

Physiognomy 
10.8% lands are high hills. 10% lands are plain. 79.2% lands are low hills. There are more than 20 small mountains, including Mount Baizhao, Mount Daan, Mount Cha, Mount Yueluo. The highest point whose altitude is 517 meters locates at the Taiping Village. The lowest point whose altitude is 31 meters locates at Guzhou Bay.

Climate 
Anlu’s climate is subtropical monsoon. There are 60 days for spring and autumn and 120 days for winter and summer. Summer is humid and hot, while winter is dry and cold. Yearly mean temperature is 15.8℃. Lowest temperature is -15.3℃ (Jan 30, 1977). Highest temperature is 40.5℃ (August 23, 1959). Yearly mean amount of precipitation is 1172 millimeter. Highest yearly amount of precipitation is 1172.6 millimeter (1954). Lowest yearly amount of precipitation is 652.9 millimeter (1978). Most raining days are from April to August.

Land Resources 
Total land area is 1355 square kilometers. The arable land is 50167.09 hectares, which is 37.1% of the total area. Garden covers an area of 917.68 hectares, which is 0.4% of the total area. Forest land area is 29498.77 hectares, which is 21.7% of the total area. The combination of villages and industrial land area is 13171.2 hectares, which is 9.7% of the total area. Traffic land area is 1651.3 hectares, which is 1.2% of the total area. Water area is 17161.0 hectares, which is 12.7% of the total area. The unused area is 22,725.1 hectares, which is 17.2% of the total land area.

Water resources 
The river course is a part of the Yangtze River basin. Fu River basin covers 677 square kilometers, which is 50.6% of the total water areas. Zhang River basin covers 232 square kilometers, which is 17.7%. The Zishi River basin covers 100 square kilometers, which is 0.7%. Qingshui River basin covers 16 square kilometers, which is 0.1%. The main river is Fu River and Zhang River, with a total length of 78.7 kilometers. The total length of the river is 812.7 km. The river network density is 0.6 kilometers per square kilometers. The runoff volume is 500 million cubic meters. The annual drainage volume is 1.45 billion cubic meters. The maximum annual drainage volume is 1.8 billion cubic meters. The largest river in the territory is Fu River, which flows from north to south through Burgundy, Yandian, Fushui, Fucheng, Nancheng, Tangdi, Xundian and Xinli. The river basin covers an area of 677 square kilometers, with an average annual runoff of 3570 cubic meters per second.

Population 
In 2019, There were 201,700 households in Anlu, with a registered population of 617,100 (143,500 in urban areas and 473,600 in rural areas). There were 318,200 males and 298,900 females. There were 10,500 aged 17 and under, and 109,500 aged 60 and over. At the end of the year, the city's permanent population is 583,300. The permanent population urbanization rate is 52.63%. In 2019, 7,983 people (4,143 males and 3,840 females) were born, among whom 3,979 had a second child. The birth rate was 12.32‰. There were 2,643 deaths, with a mortality rate of 4.08 per 1,000 people; The natural population growth rate is 8.24 per thousand

References 

County-level divisions of Hubei
Cities in Hubei
Xiaogan